Étienne Vincent Borne (January 22, 1907 – June 14, 1993) was born in Manduel (Gard). He was a professor of philosophy Hypokhâgne at Lycée Henri-IV in Paris. Étienne Borne founded the Mouvement republicain populaire (MRP), and the French Christian Democratic Party. He was a columnist in the newspaper La Croix.
 Jacques Derrida was one of his students.

References

People from Gard
1907 births
1993 deaths
École Normale Supérieure alumni
20th-century French philosophers
20th-century French journalists
Winners of the Prix Broquette-Gonin (literature)
Lycée Henri-IV teachers